The Theological Library of Caesarea Maritima, or simply the Library of Caesarea, was the library of the Christians of Caesarea Maritima in Palestine in ancient times.

History
Through Origen and especially the scholarly presbyter Pamphilus, an avid collector of books of Scripture, the theological school of Caesarea won a reputation for having the most extensive ecclesiastical library of the time, containing more than 30,000 manuscripts: Gregory Nazianzus, Basil the Great, Jerome and others came to study there. The Caesarean text-type is recognized by scholars as one of the earliest New Testament types.

Saint Pamphilus devoted his life to searching out and obtaining ancient texts which he collected in the famous library that Jerome was later to use, and established a school for theological study. In the scriptorium, a necessary adjunct to all libraries of antiquity, he oversaw the production of accurate edited copies of Scripture. Testimonies to his zeal and care in this work are to be found in the colophons of biblical manuscripts.  Jerome's De Viris Illustribus (75) says that Pamphilus "transcribed the greater part of the works of Origen of Alexandria with his own hand," and that "these are still preserved in the library of Cæsarea."

Among other priceless lost treasures in the library was the Gospel according to the Hebrews. Jerome knew of this copy of the so-called "Hebrew" or Aramaic text of the Gospel of Matthew and Eusebius refers to the catalogue of the library that he appended to his life of Pamphilus. A passage from the lost life, quoted by Jerome, describes how Pamphilus supplied impoverished scholars with the necessaries of life and gave them copies of the Scriptures, of which he kept a large supply. He likewise bestowed copies on women devoted to study. The great treasure of the library at Caesarea was Origen's own copy of the "Hexapla," probably the only complete copy ever made. It was consulted by Jerome. St Pamphilus was martyred in February, 309.

The collections of the library suffered during the persecutions under the Emperor Diocletian, but were repaired subsequently by bishops of Caesarea. Acacius of Caesarea and Euzoius, successors of Eusebius, concentrated on conservation.

It was noted in the 6th century, but Henry Barclay Swete was of the opinion that it probably did not long survive the capture of Caesarea by the Saracens in 638, and this claim is repeated, without citation, in a modern reference: the “large library survived at Caesarea until destroyed by the Arabs in the 7th cent.” O'Connor says of this library, "The tradition of scholarship ... was continued by Pamphilius (d. 309).  By adding to the manuscript collection of Origen he created a library second only to that of Alexandria; in 630 it had 30,000 volumes."  This number is based on Isidore of Seville's estimate in his Etymologiae. For further information see the article on the Muslim conquest of the Levant.

See also
Early centers of Christianity

References

Ancient libraries
Caesarea, Israel
Libraries in Israel
Ancient Christianity
Christian libraries